Janusz Waldemar Cisek (February 8, 1955 – February 28, 2020) was a Polish historian, academic lecturer, director of the Pilsudski Institute and Polish Army Museum, from 2012 to 2013 Undersecretary of State in the Ministry of Foreign Affairs.

Biography 
A graduate of the High School National Education Commission in Stalowa Wola, in 1980 he graduated from history at the Jagiellonian University. In 1993 he obtained a doctoral degree in humanities at the University of Wrocław based on the work entitled General Belarusian Branches of General Stanisław Bułak-Bałachowicz in the policy of Józef Piłsudski during the Polish-Bolshevik war (March-December 1920). In 2003 he was habilitated at the same university. In 2013 he received the title of professor of humanities.

Initially, he worked in the Krakow archives. In 1986 he went to New York, worked at the Pilsudski Institute, serving as deputy director (1989–1992) and director (1992–2000) of this institution. After returning to Poland, he was the deputy department director at the Ministry of Culture (2001–2002) and vice president of Stalowa Wola (2002–2003). In 2006 he became the director of the Polish Army Museum, which he held until 2012. As an academic lecturer he was associated with the Jagiellonian University, where he became an associate professor at the Institute of European Studies. He also became the chief commander of the Strzelce Association of the Socio-Educational Organization (2008–2012), a member of the authorities of the Foundation of Former Soldiers of Special Forces GROM and a member of the Polish Scientific Society in Exile.

In the elections in 2011, he unsuccessfully ran for the Senate from the PSL. On 11 June 2012, he was appointed undersecretary of state in the Ministry of Foreign Affairs. On April 24, 2013, he was dismissed after resignation, which was motivated by health reasons – the need to undergo chemotherapy in connection with leukemia. On February 28 in the morning he died from Leukemia.

Orders 
In 2009, he was awarded the Officer's Cross of the Order of Polonia Restituta.

Selected bibliography
  Kalendarium życia Józefa Piłsudskiego 1867–1935, tomy 1–4, LTW, Łomianki 2007
  Józef Piłsudski, Świat Książki, Warszawa 2007
  Do niepodległości (współautor z Markiem Ciskiem), Świat Książki, Warszawa 2008

References 

Jagiellonian University alumni
People from Stalowa Wola
Recipients of the Order of Polonia Restituta
21st-century Polish historians
Polish male non-fiction writers
1955 births
2020 deaths
Academic staff of Jagiellonian University
Individuals associated with the Józef Piłsudski Institute of America
20th-century Polish historians